"La Perla" is the third single by alternative rap band Calle 13 taken from their third studio album Los de Atrás Vienen Conmigo, released on April 9, 2009 by Sony BMG. The song is about the historical shanty town of the same name, located astride the northern historic city wall of the Old San Juan and features Panamanian salsa singer Rubén Blades and samba group La Chilinga. A music video was made and released for this song. Calle 13 and Ruben Blades performed the song at the Latin Grammy Awards for 2009.

Charts

References

External links
 LaCalle13.com

2009 singles
Calle 13 (band) songs
Sony BMG Norte singles
2008 songs
Latin Grammy Award for Best Short Form Music Video
Rubén Blades songs
Songs written by Rubén Blades
Songs written by Residente